Line 4 of the Fuzhou Metro is a metro line in Fuzhou. It starts at Banzhou and ends at Difengjiang. The total length is 28.4 km. Line 4's color is  yellow. It is planned to open in September 2023.

Stations

References 

04
Proposed public transport in China